Jersey Post is the licensed universal service provider of mail service for the Bailiwick of Jersey.

History 
Jersey Post was established (as the Committee for Postal Administration) by the Post Office (Jersey) Law 1969, in 1969 as a result of an Order in Council which enabled the Crown dependencies to establish independent postal services.

Jersey is postcoded as the JE postcode area, established between 1990 and 1994 as an extension of the United Kingdom postcode system. Previously, Jersey did not have postcodes (despite an unsuccessful experiment using delivery round numbers).

Jersey Post International Limited was incorporated as a Limited Liability Company by the States Assembly on 1 July 2006 when the  Postal Services (Jersey) Law 2005 came fully into force allowing competition in this sector for the first time. It is licensed by the Jersey Competition Regulatory Authority as a Class II postal operator and, as such, is designated to hold significant market power and thus is liable for the universal service on the Island.

Jersey Philatelic Bureau 
In 1969, with the establishment of Jersey Post, UK postage stamps ceased to be valid in the Crown dependencies. The Bailiwicks had previously produced stamps and operated independent postal systems during the 1940–1945 German occupation of the Channel Islands.

Jersey Post has a philatelic department which researches, designs, produces and markets Jersey postage stamps which are then sold to stamp collectors worldwide. Jersey Post is member of the Small European Postal Administration Cooperation (SEPAC), which is an organisation that represents small post offices in Europe in connection with both philatelic and postal matters.

Postal and other services 

Jersey Post entered other markets while still a States department. These include Promail, its mailing house set up in 1996, and Offshore Solutions, its fulfilment service. Promail provides a bulk mail service for the offshore financial community. In 2007, its fulfilment service was affected by changes in States policy and as a consequence it decided to withdraw from this market with the potential loss of over 60 jobs unless a private buyer can be found.

In 2006, Jersey Post added a new premium service (FedEx Express) which Jersey Post calls J-express.

In December 2009, Jersey Post launched Jersey's first virtual telephone network, a pay as you go mobile telephone service called Me:Mo. In 2011, this telecoms service was terminated, and customer accounts were transferred to Airtel-Vodafone.

In 2016, Jersey Post Group acquired UK based European logistics company, Fraser Freight, this acquisition formed the basis for global logistics company JPGL.

References

Communications in Jersey
Postal organizations
Postal system of the United Kingdom
Members of the Small European Postal Administration Cooperation
Organisations based in Jersey
1969 establishments in Jersey
Government agencies established in 1969